is a Japanese politician from Tokyo and a member of the Democratic Party of Japan. He represents the House of Representatives Tokyo 20 electoral district. A native of Chiyoda, Tokyo and graduate of Sophia University, he worked at Recruit from 1988 to 1996. He was elected to the House of Representatives for the first time in 2000.

References

External links 
  in Japanese.

Members of the House of Representatives (Japan)
1964 births
People from Chiyoda, Tokyo
Living people
Sophia University alumni
Democratic Party of Japan politicians
Recruit (company)
21st-century Japanese politicians